Eremias kopetdaghica (commonly known as the Kopet Dagh racerunner) is a species of lizard found in  Turkmenistan and Iran. It is sometimes considered a subspecies of Eremias strauchi.

References

Eremias
Reptiles described in 1972
Taxa named by Mykola Szczerbak